Hans Hermann Hüter (born March 21, 1906, † June 9, 1970 in Huntsville, Alabama) was a German-Swiss rocket engineer.

Being part of the engineering team around Hermann Oberth, Rudolf Nebel and Klaus Riedel (together with Wernher von Braun, Rolf Engel, Hans Bermüller, Paul Ehmayr, Kurt Heinisch and Helmuth Zoike) Hüter was involved in the development, construction and tests of the first rockets powered by liquid gas - initially at the Berlin-Reinickendorf rocket airfield, most recently at the Peenemünde Army Research Center. He was supposed to fly as a passenger in the "Magdeburg pilot rocket" in 1933, but this flight ultimately failed.

After World War II, he was brought to the United States as part of Operation Paperclip, where he worked in the group of Wernher von Braun at Fort Bliss. In 1960 he became head of the Agena and Centaur Systems Office at NASA.

References 

 Akte 001055, NASA Historical Reference Collection, NASA History Division, Washington DC
 Frank-E. Rietz: Die Magdeburger Pilotenrakete, mdv, 
 Frank H. Winter: Prelude to the Space Age, The Rocket Societies: 192-1940, Smithsonian Institution Press, 
 Frederick C. Durant III & George S. James: Smithsonian Annals of Flight Nr. 10, Smithsonian Institution Press
 Wernher von Braun/Frederick I. Ordway: The rocket‘s red glare, Doubleday, p. 135

1906 births
1970 deaths
German rocket scientists